Taming may refer to:
Animal taming
Animal training
Taming (shield), a Philippine shield
Taming Sari, a legendary Malay kris